"Non sono una signora" (i.e. "I am not a lady") is an Italian pop-rock song written by Ivano Fossati and performed by  Loredana Bertè. Considered Bertè's signature song, it has influenced her provocative imagine and aggressive style in the following years of career. It has been described as a "career catch" song for Berté.

Bertè's sister, Mia Martini, asked to her then-partner singer-songwriter Ivano Fossati to compose a song for her sister Loredana and wrote for her the song 'Non sono una signora'. The song won the 1982 edition of Festivalbar.

Track listing
7" single –  CGD 10407
 "Non sono una signora" –  3:28 (Ivano Fossati) 
 "Radio" – 3:30  (Maurizio Piccoli)

Charts

Certifications

References

 

1982 singles
1982 songs
Loredana Bertè songs
Songs written by Ivano Fossati
Compagnia Generale del Disco singles